Kedestes sublineata, the black-veined ranger, is a butterfly in the family Hesperiidae. It is found in Namibia. The habitat consists of dry savanna.

Adults are on wing year round, except in the winter months.

References

Butterflies described in 1953
s
Endemic fauna of Namibia
Butterflies of Africa